Punto Informatico (literally "Informatic point", pun for "Informative place") is an Italian online newspaper.

Founded in 1995 and established in 1996, it has been the first Italian daily newspaper published online and one of the most read and influential in Italy. With 1.1 millions of reader per month, the online edition was the third most widely read in Italy as of June 2008, after La Repubblica, Corriere della Sera and La Stampa.

It has a front page and several specific section dedicated to different topics such as "topicality", "technology", "law", "business" and "security". It has also been defined a "source for legal information", because of its interest to legal related topics and expert writers.

Punto Informatico was nominated twice for the Ischia International Journalism Award, in 2009 and 2010.

People

Editorial staff
Massimo Sesti (owner, from 2010)
Andrea De Andreis (owner, 1995/2010)
Massimo Mattone (editor-in-chief, from 2010)
Paolo De Andreis (editor-in-chief, 1995/2010)
Luca Schiavoni (graphic, columnist, 1995/2009)

Previous and current columnists
 Luca Schiavoni - "Download"
 Massimo Mantellini - "Contrappunti"
 Marco Calamari - "Cassandra Crossing"
 Luca Spinelli - "Puntodivista"
 Dario Bonacina - "Telefonia"
 Alessandro Del Rosso

Other writers
 Paolo Attivissimo
 Dario d'Elia
 Alfonso Maruccia
 Giulio Fornasar
 Luca Saccomani

Awards
 Beta Logo Awards (Communication), 1999, Beta Magazine
 Premio WWW 2005 (Technology and innovation), Il Sole 24 Ore
 Premio WWW 2006 (Technology and innovation), Il Sole 24 Ore
 Big Brother Awards (Italy) 2010 (positive section), Winston Smith - eroe della Privacy

References

External links
Official Website
TurboNews Website 

1995 establishments in Italy
Italian-language newspapers
Italian news websites
Italian-language websites
Newspapers published in Rome
Publications established in 1995